Le Héron is a commune in the Seine-Maritime department in the Normandy region in north-western France.

Geography

Population

Places of interest
 An eighteenth-century château and its park.
 The seventeenth-century fortified manorhouse at Malvoisine. Manoir de Malvoisine also appeared in the movie Bon Voyage, Charlie Brown (and Don't Come Back!!).
 A nineteenth-century chapel.
 The remains of the church of Notre-Dame et Saint-Gilles, dating from the twelfth century, burnt down in 1879.

See also
Communes of the Seine-Maritime department

References

Communes of Seine-Maritime